Stanley A. Boutin  (born 1955) is a professor of population ecology in the University of Alberta Department of Biological Sciences. He is scientific co-director of the Alberta Biodiversity Monitoring Institute and an Alberta Biodiversity Conservation Chair.

Select awards and recognition
 2006 – Fellow, Royal Society of Canada
 2009 – Miroslaw Romanowski Medal, Royal Society of Canada
 2018 — C. Hart Merriam Award, American Society of Mammalogists

References

External links
 University home page
 Kluane Red Squirrel Project

Living people
Canadian ecologists
Fellows of the Royal Society of Canada
Place of birth missing (living people)
Academic staff of the University of Alberta
1955 births
20th-century Canadian scientists
21st-century Canadian scientists